Pierre Jacob (January 29, 1953 – July 21, 2018) was a Canadian politician, he was elected to the House of Commons of Canada in 2011 and served until 2015. He represented the electoral district of Brome—Missisquoi as a member of the New Democratic Party.

Prior to being elected, Jacob was a youth offenders instructor. He held a college diploma in social sciences and psychology, a bachelor's degree in criminology and law and an advanced diploma in public administration.

Suffering from health problems, Jacob did not stand in the 2015 election. He died in 2018.

References

External links

1953 births
2018 deaths
French Quebecers
Members of the House of Commons of Canada from Quebec
New Democratic Party MPs
People from Trois-Rivières
21st-century Canadian politicians